Shirley Osborne is a politician in Montserrat. She was Speaker of the Legislative Assembly of Montserrat between September 2014 and October 2019. She is the daughter of the late John Osborne, a former Chief Minister of Montserrat. 

Osborne trained as a teacher and in 1995 received an MBA from Simmons School of Management. She has served as Executive Director of the Women’s Resource Centre in St Peters.

In 2016, Osborne and a friend, hiking in a wooded area near Soldier Ghaut (a seasonal streambed) in the northwest area of the island, discovered nine petroglyphs, known as the Soldier Ghaut petroglyphs.

References

Year of birth missing (living people)
Living people
Speakers of the Legislative Assembly of Montserrat
Montserratian women in politics
21st-century British women politicians
Women legislative speakers